Stamps.com is an American company that provides Internet-based mailing and shipping services.  Until its acquisition by Thoma Bravo Stamps.com was a public company traded on the NASDAQ exchange under the symbol STMP.  The company's main offices are located in El Segundo, California.

History
Founded in 1996, Stamps.com was created under the name StampMaster by Jim McDermott, Ari Engelberg, and Jeff Green, who at the time were MBA graduate students at UCLA. StampMaster was among the first companies to obtain approval from the United States Postal Service for beta testing and introducing Internet postage to the market. The Postal Service began announcing proposals for digital delivery of postage in 1996.

Stamps.com finished its Series A funding in February 1998 with $1.5 million. Series B funding followed in August 1998 with $4.52 million. It had its last round of private financing in February 1999, generating an additional $30 million from investors including former Postmaster General, Marvin Runyon. The company went public in June of the same year and raised $55 million in its IPO. Less than six months after its IPO, the company had its secondary public offering. In August 1999, the Postal Service granted permission for Stamps.com to sell its service nationally. Stamps.com purchased IShip.com, a company that compared prices of shipping services, for $305 million in stock or eight million shares, in October 1999.

In 2001, Stamps.com named Ken McBride its CEO. The U.S. Postal Service authorized the first market test of PhotoStamps in 2004. In 2005, the company reported $10.4 million in net income. PhotoStamps was re-launched in May 2005 for another year-long test run. The United States Congress amended a law in January 2006 that had prohibited attaching business advertising to postage, effective in May of that year, which cleared the way for businesses to use PhotoStamps. In September 2006, the company launched Photo NetStamps, which combined its previous NetStamps product with PhotoStamps. This combination allowed PhotoStamps to be used with exact postage printed from Stamps.com software. By 2008, Stamps.com had more than 300,000 customers. The company recorded revenues of $38.6 million in 2012.

By 2013, it had approximately 465,000 registered customers. Stamps.com reported $147.3 million in revenue the following year. It acquired ShipStation, a web-based multi-carrier shipping vendor based in Austin, Texas, in June 2014 for $50 million and up to 768,900 shares of stock. ShipStation was founded in 2010 and creates tools to import orders from shopping cart platforms for order fulfillment. The acquisition made ShipStation an independent subsidiary of Stamps.com operated by its existing management team. In October that same year, Stamps.com acquired ShipWorks, a multi-carrier shipping software company that integrates with shopping cart platforms, for $22 million. ShipWorks continues to operate as an independent, wholly owned subsidiary.

In March 2015, Stamps.com entered into an agreement to acquire Endicia, another internet postage company, from Newell Rubbermaid for approximately $215 million. Endicia's products include the DYMO Stamps and PictureItPostage brands.

On June 20, 2016, Stamps.com announced that it had entered into a definitive agreement to purchase ShippingEasy, Inc., an Austin, Texas-based company which offers web-based multi-carrier shipping software that allows online retailers and e-commerce merchants to organize, process, fulfill and ship their orders. Stamps.com agreed to acquire ShippingEasy for $55 million in cash, as well as performance-linked equity awards of 87,000 shares of Stamps.com's common stock.

On July 25, 2018, Stamps.com announced another agreement to purchase Metapack Ltd., a London-based company providing delivery management technology to e-commerce retailers and brands. The agreement was made on the price of approx. £175 million in cash. MetaPack will continue to operate as a wholly owned subsidiary led by its current management team with further details of the acquisition to be discussed on August 1, 2018.

On July 9, 2021, Thoma Bravo announced a pending acquisition of Stamps.com at a $330/share price, and a 40-day "go-shop" period for alternative proposals.

Products

Online postage

Stamps.com allows users to print official United States Postal Service stamps and shipping labels for a monthly subscription fee of $17.99. Stamps.com sends customers a digital scale to weigh letters and packages to ensure the correct amount of postage is applied to the piece of mail. The amount of postage applied is then deducted from the customer's Stamps.com account. Customers can print postage on envelopes, regular paper or adhesive labels. The system integrates with external address books applications including Outlook and Act!, small business applications such as Microsoft Word and Intuit's QuickBooks, and e-commerce platforms such as eBay, Shopify, Magento, and Amazon.com.

PhotoStamps
Stamps.com also offered a product called PhotoStamps that allows customers to upload personal photographs or logos to be printed on real U.S. postage stamps. PhotoStamps were sold as a sheet of 20 postage stamps. The service was discontinued on June 10, 2020 after the USPS discontinued its customized postage program.

Illegal activities
While The Smoking Gun successfully ordered PhotoStamps with controversial images, Stamps.com's current policy prohibits images of world leaders or "any material that is vintage in appearance or depicts images from an older era."

Customers are charged their monthly subscription fees at the end of the month, and thus a customer is charged a final payment when canceling the month-to-month service. In 2009, Stamps.com settled a class-action lawsuit in which the plaintiffs alleged unreasonable hold times when they attempted to cancel service over the phone, which resulted in delayed closing of their accounts. 

The company suffered continued controversy in the 2010s over free trials that eventually converted into monthly service fees with little notice given to customers. This practice resulted in Stamps.com settling a $2.5 million consumer protection lawsuit, won by the state of California in 2015. The press release cited "false and misleading advertising", which was corroborated by independent tech publishers. Stamps.com maintains that such charges are valid and well-explained.

See also
 Pitney Bowes 
 Endicia Internet Postage

References

External links

Online companies of the United States
Internet properties established in 1996
Postal services
1996 establishments in California
Companies based in El Segundo, California
Companies formerly listed on the Nasdaq
1999 initial public offerings
2021 mergers and acquisitions